Passiflora caerulea, the blue passionflower, bluecrown passionflower or common passion flower, is a species of flowering plant native to South America. It has been introduced elsewhere. Its leaves are palmate, and its fragrant flowers are blue-white with a prominent fringe of coronal filaments in bands of blue, white,yellow, and brown. In South America, the plant is known for its medicinal properties, and is used by both the Toba and the Maka peoples.

Names
The specific epithet caerulea means "blue" and refers to the blue coronal filaments.

Description

It is edible to humans when ripe, but tends to have an undesirable flavour.

Cultivation
Passiflora caerulea is widely cultivated as a wall-climber or as groundcover. It can become invasive, the twining shoots constantly appearing unless eradicated. It has gained the Royal Horticultural Society's Award of Garden Merit.

Cultivars

A number of cultivars have been produced from the species:

'Chinensis' (corona filaments paler blue)
'Constance Elliott' was raised by Kucombe and Prince in Exeter, Great Britain. It has pure white, fragrant flowers; not as free-flowering as many other clones. It has also won the Award of Garden Merit from the Royal Horticultural Society.
'Pierre Pomie', a pale pink flower form

Chemical constituents
Compared to Passiflora incarnata, this plant contains higher amounts of the MAO-inhibitor harmine.

Other uses

Though the fruit is edible, it is rather insipid when eaten raw. A tea can be made of the flower or leaves; however, tetraphyllin B and epi-tetraphyllin B,  cyanogenic glycosides which liberate hydrogen cyanide when activated by enzymes, have been found in the leaves. It is possible to boil away most of the cyanide.

In South America, the plant is known for its medicinal uses. It is used in both herbal tea and dietary supplements, as well as in marmalades, ice creams, syrups and beverages. It is also used by the indigenous Argentinian Toba and Maka people.

The passion flower is the national flower of Paraguay. Its intricate structure has generated Christian symbolism, each part representing a different part of the Passion of Christ. The "Etymology and names" section of Passiflora contains more information about this symbolism.

Gallery

References

External links
 
Topwalks.net: Passiflora caerulea

caerulea
Flora of Argentina
Flora of Brazil
Flora of Uruguay
Garden plants of South America
Plants described in 1753
Taxa named by Carl Linnaeus